David K. Coburn is a former American college athletics administrator. He was named athletic director in May 2019 after being the interim athletic director.

Education
Coburn is a triple alumnus of Florida State University, receiving his Juris Doctor degree from the Florida State College of Law. Since 2012, Coburn has also taught political science and law classes for Florida State.

Athletic Director

Florida State
Coburn was named the 12th athletic director of Florida State in May 2019 after being the interim athletic director for the previous 8 months. It was announced that Coburn would retire in 2022 with his explanation being that Florida State needed a younger athletic director to oversee Florida State during new, unprecedented times.

References

Florida State University alumni
Living people
Year of birth missing (living people)
Florida State Seminoles athletic directors